The Frank McKinnon Memorial Trophy is an annual award given by the Manitoba Junior Hockey League (MJHL) to the player adjudged to have exhibited the best type of sportsmanship and gentlemanly conduct combined with a high standard of playing ability during the regular season.  The trophy is named after the late former MJHL commissioner and Hockey Canada executive.

History
The first trophy awarded by the MJHL for sportsmanship was the Cadet Trophy.  It was succeeded by the Lorne Lyndon Memorial Trophy in 1966, named in honour of one of Canada's most renowned officials who officiated from 1933 to 1953, including six Allan Cup finals, three Memorial Cup finals, and the 1951 Alexander Cup. The Lyndon Trophy was retired in favour of the current trophy, which awarded for the first time during the 2017–18 season.

Winners

References

External links 
Manitoba Junior Hockey League
Manitoba Hockey Hall of Fame

Hockey Hall of Fame
Winnipeg Free Press Archives
Brandon Sun Archives

Manitoba Junior Hockey League trophies and awards